The Great Lakes Intercollegiate Athletic Conference (GLIAC) women's basketball tournament is the annual conference basketball championship tournament for the Great Lakes Intercollegiate Athletic Conference. The tournament has been held annually since 1991. It is a single-elimination tournament and seeding is based on regular season records.

The winner, declared conference champion, receives the GLIAC's automatic bid to the NCAA Women's Division II Basketball Championship.

Results

+Indicates won NCAA championship

Championship records

Notes

Davenport, Parkside, Purdue Northwest, and Wayne State have not yet reached the finals of the GLIAC tournament.
Lake Erie, Mercyhurst, Northwood, Ohio Dominican, Tiffin, Walsh and Westminster (PA) never reached the tournament championship game before departing the GLIAC.
 Schools highlighted in pink are former members of the Great Lakes Intercollegiate Athletic Conference.

See also
 GLIAC men's basketball tournament

References

NCAA Division II women's basketball conference tournaments
Basketball Tournament, Women's